Ben Wells or Benjamin Wells may refer to:

Ben Wells (actor) (born 1980), American actor
Ben Wells (cricketer)
Ben Wells (gridiron football) (born 1989), American gridiron football player 
Ben Wells (footballer, born 1988), English footballer
Ben Wells (footballer, born 2000), English footballer
Ben Wells (musician), guitarist for American Southern-rock band Black Stone Cherry
Ben Wells (swimmer) from Papua New Guinea, who swam at the 2003 South Pacific Games
Benjamin W. Wells (1856–1923), American literary scholar
Benjamin W. Wells (fire commissioner) (1860–1912), American government official and political activist
Benjamin Wells, a U.S. tax collector who was a target of violence in the Whiskey Rebellion in 1793

See also
Bertram Whittier Wells aka B.W. Wells (1884–1978), American botanist and ecologist